A destructive tornado outbreak occurred on July 2, 1997, in the built-up area of Detroit, Michigan. There were 13 tornadoes in total, 3 dragged through neighborhoods and downtown, hitting northern Detroit between I-96 and Eight Mile Road, Hamtramck and Highland Park. The storms killed 7, caused local flooding, and destroyed houses. 5 of the fatalities were recorded in Grosse Pointe Farms, Michigan, due to straight-line winds of up to 100 mph that blew a gazebo full of people into Lake St. Clair. One tornado formed east of the Detroit River, in Essex County, Ontario, near Windsor, Ontario and caused damage in Windsor and Essex County. The strongest tornado was listed as an F3.

Confirmed tornadoes

July 1 event

July 2 event

July 3 event

Other tornadoes
The Michigan tornado outbreak of July 2 was part of a larger outbreak stemming from a storm system that crossed the eastern part of North America from July 1 to July 3, 1997. On July 1, several tornadoes touched down across western and northern Minnesota north of the Twin Cities Metropolitan Area of Minneapolis and St. Paul. On July 3, several tornadoes touched down from eastern New York to southern New Hampshire. No other fatalities were reported outside of Michigan. In total, 52 tornadoes touched from northeastern Kansas to New England during the three-day event.

Aftermath 
Later that evening and the next day, the local television stations (such as WJBK, WDIV-TV, and WXYZ-TV) displayed video and images of downtown Detroit.

For the next 6 to 8 hours, there were still thunderstorms rolling and rumbling through, and many people were afraid of further tornadic activity, especially since two-thirds of the City of Windsor were without power until the next morning. Many large trees were felled by the storm's winds as well.

Tecumseh Road viaduct 
The effects on the Tecumseh Road viaduct on the west end of Windsor, Ontario, were quite overwhelming, however. The steel girder viaduct was built in 1944, and was just two lanes, going under the CN Rail line that leads to the Michigan Central Railway Tunnel. The storms associated with the tornado outbreak dumped such a large amount of rain and floodwaters, that the viaduct was flooded up to the height of a car's roof, as one automobile was submerged (The driver was unharmed, however).

Since this viaduct was a well-known traffic bottleneck (even more so for transport trucks, since the viaduct was so low, it would peel the roof off their trailers), and would flood with around a foot of water from even a light rain, that it was completely closed, torn down, and rebuilt in August 1998, and finished 2 weeks ahead of schedule, and 2 million dollars under budget. The new underpass is built of concrete, is four lanes wide, and is designed to handle the largest of transport trucks.

See also 
 List of Canadian Tornadoes
 List of North American tornadoes and tornado outbreaks
 List of tornadoes striking downtown areas

References

Sources 
 WDIV-TV, NBC 4 Detroit, Michigan
 CBET-TV, CBC 9 Windsor, Ontario

External links 
 WDIV's Coverage of the Detroit Tornadoes of 1997 - Part 1
 WDIV's Coverage of the Detroit Tornadoes of 1997 - Part 2
 WDIV's Coverage of the Detroit Tornadoes of 1997 - Part 3
 WDIV's Coverage of the Detroit Tornadoes of 1997 - Part 4
 WDIV's Coverage of the Detroit Tornadoes of 1997 - Part 5

F3 tornadoes
Tornadoes of 1997
Metro Detroit
History of Windsor, Ontario
Tornadoes in Michigan
Essex County, Ontario
Tornadoes in Ontario
Southeast Michigan Tornado Outbreak, 1997
1997 natural disasters in the United States
July 1997 events in North America
1997 in Ontario
1997 disasters in Canada
1997-07-02